John "Johnny" O'Callaghan (born 1964) is an Irish retired hurler who played as a left wing-back for the Cork senior team.

Born in Ballyhea, County Cork, O'Callaghan first arrived on the inter-county scene at the age of seventeen when he first linked up with the Cork minor team before later joining the under-21 side. He joined the senior panel during the 1985 championship. O'Callaghan was largely an unused substitute during his career, however, he did win one All-Ireland medal and two Munster medals as a non-playing substitute.

At club level O'Callaghan played with Ballyhea.

Throughout his career O'Callaghan made just one championship appearance. His retirement came following the conclusion of the 1986 championship.

Honours

Team

Cork
All-Ireland Senior Hurling Championship (1): 1986 (sub)
Munster Senior Hurling Championship (2): 1985 (sub), 1986 (sub)

References

1964 births
Living people
Ballyhea hurlers
Cork inter-county hurlers